Dr. Mark A. Matthews is an outdoor 1941 bust depicting the minister and city reformer of the same name by Alonzo Victor Lewis, installed in Seattle's Denny Park, in the U.S. state of Washington.

Description
An inscription on the front of the best, near the base, reads: . The bronze plaque on the back of the base reads: . The front of the base displays the text: .

History
The memorial was designed in 1941 and dedicated the following year. It was surveyed and deemed "treatment urgent" by the Smithsonian Institution's "Save Outdoor Sculpture!" program in October 1994.

See also

 1941 in art

References

1941 sculptures
1942 establishments in Washington (state)
Bronze sculptures in Washington (state)
Busts in Washington (state)
Monuments and memorials in Seattle
Outdoor sculptures in Seattle
Sculptures of men in Washington (state)
South Lake Union, Seattle
Stone sculptures in Washington (state)